There are two ecclesiastical provinces of the Latin Church of the Catholic church in Slovakia. Under 2 archdioceses, there are 6 suffragan dioceses. There is also a military ordinariate that is not part of either ecclesiastical province.

In addition, there is one ecclesiastical territory of the Slovak Greek Catholic Church. Under the one archeparchy, are two eparchies.

There are no titular sees or other defunct jurisdictions other than direct precursors of current dioceses.

Latin Hierarchy

Exempt 
 Military Ordinariate of Slovakia

Ecclesiastical  Province of Bratislava 
 Metropolitan Archdiocese of Bratislava
 Archdiocese of Trnava
 Diocese of Banská Bystrica
 Diocese of Nitra
 Diocese of Žilina

Ecclesiastical Province of Košice 
 Metropolitan Archdiocese of Košice
 Diocese of Rožňava
 Diocese of Spiš

Slovak Greek Catholic Ecclesiastical Province of Prešov 

(Byzantine Rite)
 Metropolitan Archeparchy of Prešov, ''also Chief of the entire rite-specific particular church
 Eparchy of Bratislava
 Eparchy of Košice

External links and sources 
 Catholic-Hierarchy entry.
 GCatholic.org.

Slovakia
Catholic dioceses